Giovanni Battista Canossa (died 1747) was an Italian wood engraver.

He was born and died in Bologna, where he trained with Giovanni Maria Viani.  He spent his whole career in the city.

References

1747 deaths
18th-century Italian people
Artists from Bologna
Italian engravers
Year of birth unknown